Vegard Skogheim (born 28 April 1966) is a Norwegian football coach and former player who played as a midfielder.

During his active career, he played for HamKam, Werder Bremen and Viking. He had a total of 197 matches and 36 goals in the Norwegian Premier League. Skogheim played 13 matches for the Norway national football team and scored a goal.

As a coach, he has been in charge of Lillehammer and Brumunddal, and has been managing Kongsvinger with success, securing promotion from Second Division in 2003, and almost repeating the feat in First Division in 2004. During winter 2006, Kongsvinger informed him, they would not sign him up for another contract, and thus he made his exit, joining former Lillestrøm coach Arne Erlandsen in his old club HamKam on 13 November 2006. Here, he acted as a player developer and assistant coach. On 11 June 2009, Skogheim was appointed new head coach of HamKam. He resigned after three games of the 2014 Norwegian First Division.

Career statistics

Club

International

Scores and results list Norway's goal tally first, score column indicates score after each Skogheim goal.

References

Living people
1966 births
Sportspeople from Hamar
Association football midfielders
Norway youth international footballers
Norway under-21 international footballers
Norway international footballers
Norwegian footballers
Hamarkameratene players
Viking FK players
SV Werder Bremen players
Eliteserien players
Norwegian expatriate footballers
Expatriate footballers in Germany
Norwegian expatriate sportspeople in Germany
Norwegian football managers
Kongsvinger IL Toppfotball managers
Hamarkameratene managers
Ullensaker/Kisa IL managers